Aleksandar Šešelj is a Serbian politician. He served in the National Assembly of Serbia from 2017 to 2020 as a member of the far-right Serbian Radical Party (Srpska radikalna stranka, SRS). Šešelj is the son of Radical Party leader Vojislav Šešelj.

Early life and career
Šešelj was born in Belgrade, Serbia, in what was then the Federal Republic of Yugoslavia. In 2018, he was a student at the University of Belgrade Faculty of Law; in the 2022 Serbian parliamentary election, he was described as an advanced university student.

Politician

Early years (2013–17)
Šešelj appeared in the fifth position on the Radical Party's electoral list for the Zemun municipal assembly in the 2013 Serbian local elections. The following year, he received the twenty-fifth position on the party's list in the 2014 Serbian parliamentary election. In both instances, the party failed to cross the electoral threshold for assembly representation.

Šešelj again received the twenty-fifth position on the SRS list in the 2016 parliamentary election and, as the list won twenty-two mandates, was not initially elected. He was also given the lead position on the party's list in Zemun in the concurrent 2016 Serbian local elections. The Radicals won nine seats out of fifty-seven in the municipal assembly and afterward participated in a coalition government led by the Serbian Progressive Party (Srpska napredna stranka, SNS). On 17 June 2016, Šešelj was appointed to the Zemun municipal council (i.e., the executive branch of the municipal government).

He took part in a youth delegation to China in November 2016, describing China as a "true and sincere friend" of Serbia. He also participated in a Radical Party delegation to Crimea in March 2017 to mark the three-year anniversary of the area's de facto joining of the Russian Federation. The government of Ukraine, which considers Crimea to be its sovereign territory, issued a five-year travel ban on Šešelj and other members of the delegation; he responded sarcastically that it would have been "a shame if no sanctions were imposed."

Member of the National Assembly and after (2017–present)
Šešelj received a mandate in the national assembly on 25 September 2017 as a replacement for fellow Radical Party member Milovan Bojić, who had resigned. By virtue of becoming a parliamentarian, he was required to resign from the Zemen municipal council, which he did on 27 October. During his term in the national assembly, Šešelj was at different times a member of the health and family committee, a member of the European integration committee, and a deputy member of the environmental protection committee. For the entirety of his term, he was a member of Serbia's parliamentary friendship group with China.

He also became a member of Serbia's delegation to the Parliamentary Assembly of the Council of Europe (PACE) on 24 November 2017, again as a replacement for Bojić. He served on the PACE committee on social affairs, health, and sustainable development and was an alternate member of the committee on culture, science, education, and media. In June 2018, he caused a minor diplomatic incident by asking Croatian foreign minister Marija Pejčinović Burić when “Croatia would return the Republic of Serb Krajina (RSK) to the people who fled before the knives of the Ustaše" (as he described the events of 1995's Operation Storm).

For most of his time in the PACE, Šešelj was not a member of any political grouping. He joined the Free Democrats Group on 26 March 2019 and became one of its vice-chairs on 10 April; the group, however, ceased to exist on 30 June of the same year.

He was the deputy leader of Miljan Damjanović's election staff in the latter's bid for mayor of Belgrade in the 2018 city election.

Šešelj was promoted to the fourth position on the Radical Party's list in the 2020 parliamentary election. As in 2014, the list did not cross the electoral threshold, and his term ended when the new parliament was sworn in on 3 August 2020. He also appeared in the lead position on the party's list for Zemun in the 2020 local elections and was re-elected when the list won two mandates. He resigned from the municipal assembly on 10 September 2020. His term in the PACE ended in January 2021.

He received the third position on the Radical Party's list in the 2022 parliamentary election. Once again, the list did not cross the electoral threshold.

Šešelj is a vice-president of the Radical Party and is a frequent spokesperson for the party in the Serbian media. In May 2022, he spoke against Serbia imposing sanctions on Russia in response to the Russo-Ukrainian War.

References

1993 births
Living people
Politicians from Belgrade
Members of the National Assembly (Serbia)
Members of the Parliamentary Assembly of the Council of Europe
Serbian Radical Party politicians
Free Democrats Group politicians